Michael Richard Devlin (born November 16, 1969) is a former professional American football player and coach who is the assistant offensive line coach for the Baltimore Ravens of the National Football League (NFL).

High school years
Devlin attended Cherokee High School in the Marlton section of Evesham Township, New Jersey and was a letterman in football. Devlin played for the second-best high school football team in New Jersey, losing The Star-Ledger Trophy to the number one team and USA Today top five ranked Union High School Farmers. Devlin would later start with two Union Farmers at the University of Iowa, running back Tony Stewart and Offensive Guard Mike Ferroni.

Professional career
Devlin was selected by the Buffalo Bills in the fifth round of the 1993 NFL Draft after playing college football as an interior lineman with the Iowa Hawkeyes.

He played 58 career games over a span of seven years in the NFL. During his three-year stint with the Buffalo Bills, he played on special teams and at center and guard, backed up All-Pro Kent Hull, and made an appearance in Super Bowl XXVIII. On March 8, 1996, Devlin signed with the Arizona Cardinals. During his time there, he was part of the starting lineup at center in all but two of twenty-six games. Devlin retired from playing after the 1999 season.

Coaching career
In 2000, he became a quality control coach for the Cardinals, before becoming an assistant offensive lineman coach. During the 2004–2005 seasons, Devlin served as offensive line coach for the Toledo Rockets. In 2006, Devlin became the tight ends coach for the New York Jets. He was promoted to offensive line coach on February 5, 2013.

Devlin left the Jets to accept the same position with the Houston Texans on January 9, 2015 to Coach the offensive line under Bill O'Brien.

In 2022 he became the assistant offensive line coach for the Baltimore Ravens.

References

External links
New York Jets coaching profile

1969 births
Living people
Cherokee High School (New Jersey) alumni
People from Evesham Township, New Jersey
American football offensive linemen
Iowa Hawkeyes football players
Buffalo Bills players
Arizona Cardinals players
Arizona Cardinals coaches
Toledo Rockets football coaches
New York Jets coaches
Houston Texans coaches
People from Blacksburg, Virginia
Baltimore Ravens coaches
Ed Block Courage Award recipients